Max D. Adams is an American screenwriter and author. The winner of a Nicholl Fellowship in Screenwriting and an Austin Film Festival screenwriting award, Adams went on to be dubbed “Red Hot Adams” by Daily Variety.

Career
Adams has worked with Columbia Pictures, Hollywood Pictures, Touchstone Pictures, Universal Pictures, Walt Disney Studios, and TriStar Pictures, among several others. Her produced feature films include Excess Baggage, The Ladykillers, One For the Money and she appeared in Tony Tarantino's Underbelly Blues.

Adams is also the founder of two international online screenwriting workshops, The Left Door and 5150, and is the author of The New Screenwriter's Survival Guide. She is also a University of Utah adjunct professor, is a former WGA online mentor, and is the founder of The Academy of Film Writing.

References

External links
 See Max Run - Official Site
 

Living people
Year of birth missing (living people)
American women screenwriters
American dramatists and playwrights
American self-help writers
University of Utah faculty
American women dramatists and playwrights
Screenwriting instructors
American women non-fiction writers
Screenwriters from Utah
American women academics